East Ruston is a village and a civil parish in the English county of Norfolk.

History
East Ruston's name is of Anglo-Saxon origin and derives from the Old English for a farmstead or village with an abundance of brushwood, or shrubs.

In the Domesday Book, East Ruston is listed as a settlement of 87 households in the hundred of Happing. In 1086, the village formed part of the East Anglian estates of Ralph Baynard.

During the Second World War, East Ruston was the location of British Army roadblocks and a reserve training area in preparation for resistance of a German invasion of England.

Geography
According to the 2011 Census, East Ruston has a population of 595 residents living in 260 households.

East Ruston falls within the constituency of North Norfolk and is represented at Parliament by Duncan Baker MP of the Conservative Party. For the purposes of local government, the parish falls within the district of North Norfolk.

Church of St. Mary

East Ruston's parish church was largely rebuilt in the Eighteenth Century on the site of previous worship and has been in the care of the Churches Conservation Trust since the 1980s. There are good examples of Nineteenth Century stained glass, particularly a depiction of the Presentation of Christ by A. L. Moore.

Amenities
The public house is called the Butchers Arms. East Ruston is the home to the noted East Ruston Old Vicarage garden which is open to the public.

Transport
The closest railway station to East Ruston is Worstead which provides Bittern Line services to Sheringham and Norwich. The nearest airport is Norwich International Airport.

Notable Residents
 Richard Porson (1759-1808)- English classicist

In Popular Culture
East Runton is named as Abe Slaney's hiding place in Sir Arthur Conan Doyle's Sherlock Holmes story, The Adventure of the Dancing Men.

War Memorial
East Ruston's war memorial takes the form of a short stone plinth topped with a Celtic cross, located in St. Mary's Churchyard. It lists the following names for the First World War:
 Second-Lieutenant Walter J. J. Brumbley MC (1898-1918), 3rd Battalion, Royal Norfolk Regiment
 Stoker-First-Class Reginald Bristow (1900-1919), HMS Bacchante
 Private Frederick J. Hilling (1886-1918), 190th (Trench Mortar) Battery, Bedfordshire Regiment
 Private George W. Riches (d.1917), 12th Battalion, Duke of Cornwall's Light Infantry
 Private Leslie W. Pointer (1897-1916), 1/9th Battalion, Durham Light Infantry
 Private Frederick G. Rump (1899-1918), 6th Battalion, Royal East Kent Regiment
 Private John Helsdon (1891-1916), 1st Battalion, Essex Regiment
 Private Clarence H. Pratt (1888-1916), 8th Battalion, Royal Fusiliers
 Private John R. Hemp (1896-1916), 1st Battalion, Royal Norfolk Regiment
 Private James Riches (1884-1917), 1st Battalion, Royal Norfolk Regiment
 Private Walter J. Cutting (1892-1917), 1/5th Battalion, Royal Norfolk Regiment
 Sapper R. Percival Taylor (1894-1917), 128th Company, Royal Engineers
 Sapper William H. Ward (d.1916), 209th (Field) Company, Royal Engineers
 Second-Hand Robert Spanton (1867-1917), H.M. Drifter Young Fred
 Trimmer Cecil V. Grimmer (d.1917), HMS Attentive
 Edward Eaton
 Charles Larkin
 William Rivers
 William Shepherd

And, the following for the Second World War:
 Sergeant Matthew Sculfer (d.1940), No. 21 Squadron RAF
 Sergeant Jack Dixon (1921-1945), No. 153 Squadron RAF
 Private Robert F. Pestell (1885-1943), Royal Army Ordnance Corps

References

External links

Villages in Norfolk
North Norfolk
Civil parishes in Norfolk